Jason Beckett (born July 23, 1980) is a Canadian former professional ice hockey defenceman who last played for the Nottingham Panthers of the British Elite Ice Hockey League (EIHL). He was drafted by the Philadelphia Flyers in the second round (42nd overall) of the 1998 NHL Entry Draft.

Career statistics

References

External links

1980 births
Canadian ice hockey defencemen
Dresdner Eislöwen players
Fort Wayne Komets players
Grand Rapids Griffins players
HK Acroni Jesenice players
Houston Aeros (1994–2013) players
Ice hockey people from Alberta
Living people
Milwaukee Admirals players
Nottingham Panthers players
Pensacola Ice Pilots players
Philadelphia Flyers draft picks
Philadelphia Phantoms players
Seattle Thunderbirds players
Sportspeople from Lethbridge
Stockton Thunder players
Syracuse Crunch players
Trenton Titans players
Västerviks IK players
Canadian expatriate ice hockey players in England
Canadian expatriate ice hockey players in Slovenia